Francis Lauder (1688-1765) was an eighteenth century Irish Anglican priest: the Archdeacon of Ardfert from 1724 until 1738.

Enraght was born in County Offaly and educated at Trinity College, Dublin. In 1721 he became Precentor of Ardfert.

References

18th-century Irish Anglican priests
Archdeacons of Ardfert
Diocese of Limerick, Ardfert and Aghadoe
People from County Offaly
1688 births
1765 deaths